Yoshinori Tashiro, also known as Toouyama, is a former sumo wrestler champion. He was ranked seventh in the Makushita division. He first learned sumo at age eight. He is 6'2" and four-hundred pounds. He retired in 2007.

He has since starred became an actor and starred in a commercial with Salman Khan and played the lead role in the unreleased Indian film Sumo. He played a small role in Detective Chinatown 3 (2021) and the upcoming John Wick: Chapter 4.

Filmography

References 

Japanese sumo wrestlers

Year of birth missing (living people)
Living people